Stéphanie Elbaz is a contemporary French concert pianist. 
She has reached leading positions in major international competitions. She has performed at the Mozarteum in Salzbourg, the De Doelen in Rotterdam, the salle Alfred Cortot in Paris, the Palazzo Ducale in Tuscany, the Essaouira festival in Morocco, etc.

She obtained her Postmaster, Master and Degree of piano with the High Distinctions in great European conservatories. She also spent three cycles of professional development in three different . She won two piano gold medals with the congratulations of the jury unanimously in two different CNR. Stéphanie Elbaz has also participated in numerous master classes in Europe.

Selected discography 
 Liszt's Rhapsodie espagnole S 254
 Bach: Prélude & Fugue in C sharp minor BVW 849
 Chopin: Fantaisie-Impromptu Opus 66
 Rachmaninov: Moments musicaux
 Granados: Danses espagnoles

References

External links 
Chaîne YouTube de Stéphanie Elbaz.
Parcours de Stéphanie Elbaz on Wiki-Narbonne.
Stéphanie Elbaz on France 3.

21st-century French women classical pianists
Year of birth missing (living people)
Living people